In Greek mythology, Lampus or Lampos (Ancient Greek: Λάμπος), a Greek verb meaning "glitter" or "shine", may refer to:

Human

Lampus, a son of Aegyptus, who married and was killed by the Danaid Ocypete.
Lampus, an elder of Troy, one of the sons of King Laomedon and Strymo, father of Dolops.
Lampus, one of the fifty Thebans who laid an ambush against Tydeus and were killed by Apollo.

Canine (dog)

Lampus, one of Actaeon's dogs

Equine (horse)

Lampus, one of the two horses that drove the chariot of Eos, the other one being Phaethon
Lampus, one of the four horses of Helios, alongside Erythreus, Acteon and Philogeus.
Lampus, one of the four horses of Hector, alongside Aethon, Xanthus and Podarges
Lampus, one of the mares of Diomedes

Other uses
Lampos is used as a surname of many families in Greece. Otherwise:
Lampus is also the name of a Macedonian horse breeder and Olympic victor, whose statue Pausanias describes in his Description of Greece.
Lampos is also the fictitious name of a sacred site in the parish of Rennes-les-Bains (Aude), France, given by the priest Henri Boudet in his work La Vraie Langue Celtique (1886).

Notes

References 

 Apollodorus, The Library with an English Translation by Sir James George Frazer, F.B.A., F.R.S. in 2 Volumes, Cambridge, MA, Harvard University Press; London, William Heinemann Ltd. 1921. . Online version at the Perseus Digital Library. Greek text available from the same website.
Dictys Cretensis, from The Trojan War. The Chronicles of Dictys of Crete and Dares the Phrygian translated by Richard McIlwaine Frazer, Jr. (1931-). Indiana University Press. 1966. Online version at the Topos Text Project.
 Fabius Planciades Fulgentius, Mythologies translated by Whitbread, Leslie George. Ohio State University Press.1971. Online version at theio.com
Gaius Julius Hyginus, Fabulae from The Myths of Hyginus translated and edited by Mary Grant. University of Kansas Publications in Humanistic Studies. Online version at the Topos Text Project.
Homer, The Iliad with an English Translation by A.T. Murray, Ph.D. in two volumes. Cambridge, MA., Harvard University Press; London, William Heinemann, Ltd. 1924. . Online version at the Perseus Digital Library.
 Homer, Homeri Opera in five volumes. Oxford, Oxford University Press. 1920. . Greek text available at the Perseus Digital Library.
Pausanias, Description of Greece with an English Translation by W.H.S. Jones, Litt.D., and H.A. Ormerod, M.A., in 4 Volumes. Cambridge, MA, Harvard University Press; London, William Heinemann Ltd. 1918. . Online version at the Perseus Digital Library
Pausanias, Graeciae Descriptio. 3 vols. Leipzig, Teubner. 1903.  Greek text available at the Perseus Digital Library.
Publius Papinius Statius, The Thebaid translated by John Henry Mozley. Loeb Classical Library Volumes. Cambridge, MA, Harvard University Press; London, William Heinemann Ltd. 1928. Online version at the Topos Text Project.
Publius Papinius Statius, The Thebaid. Vol I-II. John Henry Mozley. London: William Heinemann; New York: G.P. Putnam's Sons. 1928. Latin text available at the Perseus Digital Library.

Princes in Greek mythology
Trojans
Theban characters in Greek mythology
Horses in mythology